Dr. Gábor Zacher (born Budapest, October 8, 1960) is a Hungarian physician specializing in toxicology, Chief Medical Officer of the Toxicology Department in the Péterfy Sándor Utcai Hospital, Budapest.

His great-grandfather's cousin was Franz Sacher.

Memberships
 Mentésügyi, Sürgősségi, Katasztrófaorvostani Szakmai Kollégium
 Sürgősségi Orvostani Társaság
 Magyar Toxikológus Társaság
 Lege Artis Medicinae
 Studium & Practicum

References 

1960 births
Living people
Physicians from Budapest
Hungarian toxicologists
Hungarian people of Austrian descent